Anlage may refer to:

 Allele, a specific version of a gene, as used by Gregor Mendel
 Anlage Süd, a headquarters facility of the German Third Reich in Strzyżów, Poland
 Primordium, the initial clustering of embryonic cells from which a body part develops
 Temperament, the predisposition personality type in psychology